Glenn McClelland is an American keyboardist for the band Ween.

Glenn started playing professionally at age 16 in a piano bar, subsequently playing with blues and jazz musicians including Sonny Rhodes, Johnny Copeland, and Richie Cole. In 1987, he joined Blood Sweat and Tears, where he remained until 1995, leaving to join Ween. In 2006, he resumed his membership in Blood, Sweat and Tears (while continuing with Ween).  He is also a vocalist and keyboardist for Scott Rednor and His Band and The Happy Dog.

He has a son named Charles Glenn McClelland who is also a musician.

References 

American rock keyboardists
Year of birth missing (living people)
Living people
Blood, Sweat & Tears members
Ween members
21st-century American keyboardists
20th-century American keyboardists